Khalid El-Boumlili (born 10 April 1978) is a Moroccan long-distance runner. He competed in the men's marathon at the 2004 Summer Olympics.

References

1978 births
Living people
Athletes (track and field) at the 2004 Summer Olympics
Moroccan male long-distance runners
Moroccan male marathon runners
Olympic athletes of Morocco
Place of birth missing (living people)